The  is a national university of Japan located in the city of Fukui, Fukui, Japan.

History 

The university at first had two faculties: Faculty of Liberal Arts and Faculty of Engineering.

1966: The Faculty of Liberal Arts was renamed Faculty of Education.
1983: Fukui University of Medical Science Hospital was established.
1999: The Faculty of Education was renamed Faculty of Education and Regional Studies.
2003:  was merged with University of Fukui to constitute Faculty of Medical Sciences, and then Fukui University of Medical Science Hospital was renamed University of Fukui Hospital.

Schools and Graduate Schools 
University of Fukui has 4 undergraduate schools (学部) and 3 graduate schools (大学院研究科).

Undergraduate schools 
School of Education (教育学部)
School of Engineering (工学部)
School of Global and Community Studies (国際地域学部)
School of Medical Sciences (医学部)

Graduate schools 
Graduate School of Education (大学院教育学研究科)
Graduate School of Engineering (大学院工学研究科)
Graduate School of Medical Sciences (大学院医学系研究科)

Campuses 

 Campus
Education, Engineering, Global and Community Studies
 Campus
Medical Sciences
 Campus
Research Institute of Nuclear Engineering

References

External links 
福井大学公式ウェブサイト 
University of Fukui Official Website 

Japanese national universities
University
1949 establishments in Japan
Educational institutions established in 1949
American football in Japan
Fukui (city)